The White Rabbit is a character in Alice's Adventures in Wonderland.

White Rabbit or White Rabbits may also refer to:

Art
 White Rabbit Gallery, Chinese contemporary art museum in Sydney, Australia 
 White Rabbits (sculptors), a group of women sculptors who worked with Lorado Taft at the World's Columbian Exposition in 1893

Print
 The White Rabbit (book), by Bruce Marshall, about F. F. E. Yeo-Thomas
 White Rabbit (comics), a Marvel Comics Spider-Man villain
 White Rabbit, alias of Jaina "Jai" Hudson, a DC Comics Batman character

Film and television

 "White Rabbit", an episode of Law & Order
 White Rabbit (2013 film), an American drama film about a bullied teen

 White Rabbit (2018 film), an American comedy-drama film

 "White Rabbit" (Lost), a 2004 episode of the television show Lost
 The White Rabbit (TV series),  a 1967 British TV series based on the book by Bruce Marshall

Music
 White Rabbits (band), an American indie band
 White Rabbit (George Benson album), 1972
 White Rabbit (Egypt Central album), 2011, or its title track
 "White Rabbit" (song), a 1967 song by Jefferson Airplane
 "White Rabbit", a song by Trixie Mattel and Michelle Branch from the Blonde & Pink Albums, 2022

 The White Rabbit, a 1963 album and song by Peter Posa

Science and technology
 Snowshoe hare, a white rabbit also called the varying hare
 17942 Whiterabbit, asteroid discovered in 1999 by Y. Shimizu and T. Urata
 White Rabbit No. 6, a codename for a military trench digging machine
 A synchronized set of strobing lights on the approach end of an airport runway approach lighting system
 White Rabbit Project at CERN

Other uses
 White Rabbit (candy), a Chinese confection
 F. F. E. Yeo-Thomas (1902–1964), British Second World War secret agent called "The White Rabbit" by the Germans
 "White rabbits", a variation of the common superstitious phrase "Rabbit rabbit rabbit", said on the first of the month
 White Rabbit, an imprint of Orion Publishing Group

See also
 List of rabbit breeds
 Rabbit (disambiguation)

 White Rabbit Project (TV series), an investigative series starring the co-hosts of MythBusters

 White Rabbit Red Rabbit, a 2010 play by Nassim Soleimanpour